The 2009 Sioux Falls Cougars football team represented the University of Sioux Falls in the 2009 NAIA football season. The Cougars won the 2009 NAIA Football National Championship  with a 25–22 victory over the third-ranked . The team also won the Great Plains Athletic Conference championship with a perfect 10–0 record. This was the school's fourth NAIA national championship (1996, 2006, 2008) and third in four years. The team was coached by Kalen DeBoer.

Quarterback Lorenzo Brown was named the NAIA Player of the Year prior to the game. Sioux Falls ended the season with a 29-game winning streak going back through the 2008 season. They extended this streak to 42 games, which tied an NAIA record before losing in the 2010 championship game After the season, DeBoer left to take the offensive coordinator job at Southern Illinois University Carbondale. He finished his tenure at Sioux Falls with a 67–3 record and three national titles.

Schedule

USF went wire-to-wire as the number one team in the nation.

References

Sioux Falls
Sioux Falls Cougars football seasons
NAIA Football National Champions
College football undefeated seasons
Sioux Falls Cougars football